Cetățuia River may refer to:

 Cetățuia, a tributary of the Crasna in Vaslui County
 Luncavița River (Danube), also known as Cetățuia

See also 
 Cetățuia (disambiguation)
 Pârâul Cetății (disambiguation)